A bronze sculpture of Tomáš Garrigue Masaryk is installed at Prague Castle in Prague, Czech Republic.

The statue was supported by the Masaryk Democratic Movement, and revealed on 7 March 2000 for Masaryk's 150th birthday anniversary.

See also

 List of public art in Prague
 Statue of Tomáš Garrigue Masaryk (Washington, D.C.)

References

External links

 

Bronze sculptures in the Czech Republic
Monuments and memorials in Prague
Outdoor sculptures in Prague
Prague Castle
Sculptures of men in Prague
Statues in Prague